Jennifer Kloester is a biographer noted for her work on Georgette Heyer.

Kloester's 2011 biography of Heyer is entitled. Georgette Heyer: Biography of a Bestseller.   While researching the biography, Georgette Heyer, she discovered nine "lost" stories published by Heyer in the 1920s and 30s. They were republished in 2016 in an anthology entitled  Snowdrift and Other Stories, edited by Kloester.

Kloester's Georgette Heyer’s Regency World, an exploration of the historical, social and cultural setting of Heyer's popular novels of regency romance, was published in 2010.

References

Year of birth missing (living people)
Living people
Australian biographers